Lost Creek is a stream in Bourbon and Linn counties, in the U.S. state of Kansas.

Lost Creek was named from the fact it is a losing stream in dry weather.

See also
List of rivers of Kansas

References

Rivers of Bourbon County, Kansas
Rivers of Linn County, Kansas
Rivers of Kansas